Bhogpur is a village in Kamrup rural district, in outskirts of Guwahati, in the state of Assam, India, situated in south bank of river Brahmaputra. It is surrounded by localities of Sonapur, Jorabat, and Jagiroad.

Transport
The village is located south of National Highway 31 and connected to Guwahati with regular buses and other modes of transportation.

Attractions
The village is known for 'Tegheriya picnic spot'.

See also
 Bhauriabhita
 Barpalaha

References

Villages in Kamrup district